Mahendra Amerasinghe was a Sri Lankan cricketer. He was a right-handed batsman and right-arm medium-pace bowler who played for Moors Sports Club.

Amerasinghe made a single first-class appearance for the side, during the 1995–96 season, against Sebastianites Cricket and Athletic Club. From the tailend, he scored 19 runs in the only innings in which he batted.

External links
Mahendra Amerasinghe at CricketArchive 

Sri Lankan cricketers
Moors Sports Club cricketers
Living people
Place of birth missing (living people)
Year of birth missing (living people)